The 2021–22 Arizona Wildcats women's basketball team represented the University of Arizona during the 2021–22 NCAA Division I women's basketball season. The Wildcats were led by sixth-year head coach Adia Barnes. This was the Wildcats' 48th season at the on-campus McKale Center in Tucson, Arizona and 43rd season as a member of the Pac-12 Conference. They finished with a record of 21–8, 10–6 in Pac-12 play. The Wildcats were invited to the 2022 NCAA tournament where they defeated UNLV in the First Round before losing to North Carolina in the Second Round.

Previous season 
The Wildcats finished the season second behind Stanford in the Pacific-12 conference with a 13–4 record. They advanced to the semifinals of the 2021 Pac-12 women's tournament where they lost to no. 9 ranked UCLA and As a no. 3 seed in the NCAA tournament where they defeated Stony Brook and BYU in the first and second rounds, no. 4 ranked Texas A&M in the Sweet Sixteen, they won their region with a win over no. 12 ranked Indiana in the first-ever Elite Eight, knocked off no. 1 ranked UConn in the first-ever Final Four. Arizona reached the first-ever National Championship game, losing to no. 2 ranked Stanford (in a rematch from earlier this season) 54–53 and finishing the season with a 21–6 record.

Offseason

Departures

Transfers

2021 recruiting class

2022 recruiting class

2023 recruiting class

Preseason

Preseason rankings
 October 12 and November 3, 2021 - The Arizona Wildcats are picked to finish 5th in the both of Media and Coaches of the PAC-12 Preseason polls.

 October 19, 2021 - Arizona received No. 22 in the AP poll Top 25.

 November 3, 2021 – Arizona received No. 15 in the USA Today Coaches Poll Top 25.

Preseason awards watchlists   
October 26, 2021 – Taylor Chavez is named to the Ann Meyers Drysdale Award top 20 watch list (Best shooting guard) 
 October 27, 2021 – Sam Thomas is named to the Cheryl Miller Award top 20 watch list (Best small forward) 
 November 9, 2021 - Sam Thomas is named to the Naismith Trophy top 50 watchlist (the most outstanding female basketball player)

Preseason All Pac-12 teams 
November 3, 2021 – Preseason All-Pac-12 team: Sam Thomas and Cate Reese.

Personal

Roster 
Source:

Coaching staff

Schedule

|-
!colspan=12 style=| Exhibition

|-
!colspan=12 style=| Regular Season

|-
!colspan=12 style=| Pac-12 regular season

 

 
 

|-
!colspan=12 style=|Pac-12 Women's tournament

|-
!colspan=12 style=|NCAA tournament

Source:

Game Summaries
This section will be filled in as the season progresses.

vs Cal State Northridge

vs No. 6 Louisville

vs Texas Southern

vs Marist

vs Vanderbilt

vs DePaul

vs Rutgers

vs North Dakota State

vs New Mexico

Player statistics

Awards & milestones

Season highs

Players 
Points:  C. Reese, 21 (Louisville)
Rebounds: C. Reese, 11 (Texas Southern)
Assists: Tied, 5 (Cal State Northridge & Louisville)
Steals: K. Love, 4 (Texas Southern & Marist)
Blocks: L. Ware, 4 (Marist)
Minutes: C. Reese, 33 (Louisville)

Team 
Points: 93 (Texas Southern)
Field Goals: 36 (Texas Southern)
Field Goal Attempts: 67 (Texas Southern)
3 Point Field Goals Made: 11 (Marist)
3 Point Field Goals Attempts: 24 (Marist)
Free Throws Made:12 (Louisville)
Free Throws Attempts:14 (Louisville)
Rebounds:53 (Marist)
Assists:27 (Cal State Northridge)
Steals:15 (Texas Southern)
Blocked Shots:10 (Marist)
Turnovers:17 (Louisville)
Fouls:21 (Louisville)

Weekly awards
Cate Reese
Pac-12 Women's Basketball Player of the Week 1 (Nov. 15)

Pac-12 Conference awards and honors

National awards

Rankings

*The preseason and week 1 polls were the same.^Coaches poll was not released for Week 2.

See also
2021–22 Arizona Wildcats men's basketball team

Notes

References

Arizona Wildcats women's basketball seasons
Arizona
Arizona Wildcats women's basketball
Arizona Wildcats women's basketball
Arizona